Lavik is a former municipality in the old county of Sogn og Fjordane, Norway. It was located in the western part of the present-day municipality of Høyanger which is in Vestland county. The municipality was mostly on the northern side of the Sognefjorden. A small part of Lavik was located on the southern side of the Sognefjorden, a narrow strip of land running south around the Ikjefjorden, past the village of Øystrebø, all the way south to the border with Hordaland county. The municipality of Lavik existed from 1838 until 1861 and then again from 1905 until 1964. The administrative centre of the municipality was the village of Lavik where Lavik Church is located.

Name

The municipality (originally the parish) was named after the old Ladvik farm, since Lavik Church was located there.  The first element comes from the Old Norse word  which means "pile" or "load".  The second element possibly comes from the Old Norse word  which means "inlet".  Historically the spelling has varied greatly. It was Laduigh in the 16th century, Laduig in the 17th century, Ladvig in the 18th century, Ladevig in the 19th century, and finally Lavik in the 20th century.

History
Ladevig (later spelled Lavik) was established as a municipality on 1 January 1838 (see formannskapsdistrikt law). In 1858, the district of Klævold was separated from Lavik to constitute a municipality of its own. The split left Lavik with 2,042 inhabitants. Klævold was later renamed Kyrkjebø.  In 1861, Lavik (population: 926) was merged with the municipality of Brekke (population: 898), located on the south side of the Sognefjord, to form the new municipality of Lavik og Brekke.

On 1 January 1875, a part of Klævold with 90 inhabitants was moved to Lavik og Brekke. On 1 January 1905, the municipality was divided into two separate municipalities once again: Lavik (population: 1,182) and Brekke (population: 892). During the 1960s, there were many municipal mergers across Norway due to the work of the Schei Committee. On 1 January 1964, Lavik (population: 894) was merged with the neighboring municipality of Kyrkjebø (population: 4,742) and the unpopulated Nybø and Nygjerdet areas of Vik Municipality to form the new municipality of Høyanger.

Government

Municipal council
The municipal council  of Lavik was made up of 17 representatives that were elected to four-year terms.  The party breakdown of the final municipal council was as follows:

See also
List of former municipalities of Norway

References

External links

Map of Lavik parish (roughly the same as the old municipality)

Høyanger
Former municipalities of Norway
1838 establishments in Norway
1861 disestablishments in Norway
1905 establishments in Norway
1964 disestablishments in Norway